The 1909–10 season was the 36th season of competitive football played by Rangers.

Overview
Rangers played a total of 40 competitive matches during the 1909–10 season. The side finished third in the league, eight points behind champions Celtic, after winning 20 of the 34 matches.

The Scottish Cup campaign ended in a second round 2–0 defeat away to Clyde, having previously overcame Inverness Thistle in the first.

Results
All results are written with Rangers' score first.

Scottish League Division One

Scottish Cup

Appearances

See also 

 1909–10 in Scottish football
 1909–10 Scottish Cup

References

Rangers F.C. seasons
Rangers